Fast Company is a 1953 American comedy film directed by John Sturges and starring Howard Keel, Polly Bergen and Nina Foch. It was produced and distributed by major studio Metro-Goldwyn-Mayer.

Plot
Carol Maldon leaves New York to run her recently deceased father's stable. Rick Grayton is the trainer and jockey of her horse Gay Fleet. It is an exceptional horse, but no one yet knows Gay Fleet because it is still young.  Rick has been intentionally losing races to make the horse seem inferior so that he can buy it from Carol cheaply. However, he is discovered by Mercedes, a rival stable owner, who tells Rick's plan to Carol.

Cast
 Polly Bergen as Carol Maldon
 Howard Keel as Rick Grayton
 Nina Foch as Mercedes Bellway
 Carol Nugent as Jigger Parkson
 Marjorie Main as Ma Parkson
 Horace McMahon as Two Pair Buford
 Iron Eyes Cody as Ben Iron Mountain
 Joaquin Garay as Manuel Morales
 Robert Burton as David Sandring

Reception
According to MGM records, the film earned $392,000 in the US and Canada and $131,000 elsewhere, resulting in a loss of $275,000.

References

External links
 
  
 
 

1953 films
Films directed by John Sturges
1953 comedy films
Metro-Goldwyn-Mayer films
American horse racing films
American black-and-white films
Films with screenplays by William Roberts (screenwriter)
1950s English-language films
1950s American films